Stanley Newman can refer to:

 Stanley Newman (cricketer) (1907-1956), New Zealand cricketer
 Stanley Newman (puzzle creator) (born 1952), American puzzle creator
 Stanley Newman (snooker player) (1900-1947), English snooker player